Stephen Holgate (15 December 1971 – 16 November 2021) was an English professional rugby league footballer who played in the 1990s and 2000s.

He died on 16 November 2021, at the age of 49.

References

External links
Wigan profile

1971 births
2021 deaths
Cumbria rugby league team players
England national rugby league team players
English rugby league players
Halifax R.L.F.C. players
Hull F.C. players
Rugby league props
Rugby league second-rows
Rugby league players from Whitehaven
Wigan Warriors players
Workington Town players